Eunotiaceae is a family of diatoms in the order Eunotiales that includes the following genera:
 Actinella F.W. Lewis, 1864
 Amphicampa (C.G. Ehrenberg) J. Ralfs in A. Pritchard, 1861
 Amphorotia G.M. Williams & G. Reid, 2006
 Burliganiella C.E.Wetzel & Kociolek
 Bicudoa C.E.Wetzel, Lange-Bertalot & L.Ector, 2012
 Colliculoamphora D.M. Williams & G. Reid, 2006 †
 Desmogonium C.G. Ehrenberg in R. Schomburgk, 1848
 Eunotia C.G. Ehrenberg, 1837
 Eunotioforma J.P.Kociolek & A.L.Burliga, 2013
 Euodia J.W. Bailey ex J. Ralfs in A. Pritchard, 1861
 Perinotia D. Metzeltin & H. Lange-Bertalot, 2007
 Semiorbis R. Patrick in R. Patrick & C.W. Reimer, 1966
 Temachium Wallroth, 1833

Description
 Valves with bilateral symmetry (symmetric about a line)
 Valves often asymmetrical to the apical axis
 Raphe system is short and provides weak motility
 Raphe located on valve mantle and face
 Cells may possess 2 or more rimoportulae (labiate processes)

References

 The Diatoms of the United States, Exclusive of Alaska and Hawaii: Fragilariaceae, Eunotiaceae, Achnanthaceae, Naviculacae. R Patrick, CW Reimer; 1966
 Bacillariophyceae, Teil 3. Centrales, Fragilariaceae, Eunotiaceae, Achnanthaceae. K Krammer, H Lange-Bertalot, Shsswasserflora von Mitteleuropa. VEB Gustav Fisher …, 1991
 Amphorotia nov. gen., a new genus in the family Eunotiaceae (Bacillariophyceae), based on Eunotia clevei Grunow in Cleve et Grunow. DM Williams, G Reid, 2006

External links

 Eunotiaceae at WoRMS
Diatoms.org 

Eunotiales
Diatom families